Vereniging Martijn ("Martijn Association"; stylized as MARTIJN) was a Dutch association that advocated the societal acceptance of pedophilia and legalization of sexual relationships between adults and children.

Establishment
The organization began in 1984.  It claimed to fight for "the social and societal acceptance of child-adult relationships", emphasising what they called the "consent of both child and adult" and the "freedom for the child to withdraw from the relationship".  It claimed to be in favour of "objective, scientifically verifiable truth and against political terror and discrimination."

OK Magazine
From 1986 until 2006 the group published OK Magazine, available only through the mail and not in shops, featuring essays, letters, interviews and photographs of scantily clad or naked children, mostly boys.

Opposition

MARTIJN was expelled from the International Lesbian and Gay Association in 1994. The group was seen as "widely reviled" though Dutch prosecutors initially formed the view that it could not be prosecuted.

In 2003 Vereniging MARTIJN faced opposition by the Actiecomité Stop MARTIJN (Action Committee Stop MARTIJN), which organized demonstrations against them. Formed and led by Michiel Smit of the New Right, Florens van der Kooi of the NNP, as well as Inge Bleecke of Moeders tegen Pedofilie (Mothers against Pedophilia), the committee was labelled as extreme right by their opponents.

Photographs of Princess Amalia
The organization was in the news in October 2007 when it was learned that photographs of Princess Catharina-Amalia (then aged 3½), daughter of Willem-Alexander, Prince of Orange (now King) and his wife Princess Maxima (now Queen), were on display on the website's forum. The Prince went to court to request a €50,000 fine and the removal of the photos from the website. The court agreed that the photos must be removed, and imposed a fine of €5,000 to be paid every time photos of children of the royal family are placed on the site again. The organisation had to pay €1,235 in costs.

Police investigations

The home of the organization's president, Ad van den Berg, was raided by police in October 2010; downloads of illegal material had been traced back to Van den Berg's internet connection. It was announced in March 2011 that large quantities of child pornography were found among the confiscated material, and even more material, including computers, was confiscated when Van den Berg was arrested on 29 March. In October 2018 he was convicted of possession of child pornography, and sentenced to three years imprisonment. 

Suspects in the Amsterdam sex case, an investigation into the abuse of tens of children in Amsterdam kindergartens, were members of MARTIJN.

Priests' involvement
On 20 May 2011 Herman Spronck, the head of the Dutch arm of the Salesian Catholic order, confirmed to RTL Nieuws that a priest under him had been on the board of MARTIJN until the Van den Berg raids. He added, "Of course we reject this and distance ourselves from this personal initiative." RTL obtained interviews both with Spronck and the priest (73-year-old "Father Van B.") in which the two defended adult-child sex as not always damaging. The priest concerned had prior convictions for child sexual abuse. The provincial for the Salesians, Jos Claes, opened disciplinary procedures against Spronck.

Disbandment 
On 18 June 2011, the Ministry of Security and Justice announced that the association's activities were not illegal. Crimes committed by its members could not be attributed to the association and as such the organisation could not be prosecuted, banned or disbanded.

On 27 June 2012, a Dutch court in Assen ruled that the group was illegal and ordered the group to cease activities and disband immediately. The judge stated that the group's actions and statements regarding sexual contact between adults and children were in conflict with the accepted norms and values of Dutch society. In his statement, the judge emphasised the overriding need to protect children. However, in April 2013, a higher court overturned this decision, upholding the Martijn club's right to freedom of association. On 18 April 2014 the Supreme Court overturned the acquittal and reinstated the trial judge's order. In 2015, an appeal by the association to the European Court for Human Rights (ECHR) was rejected.

See also 

Edward Brongersma
Dutch Society for Sexual Reform
Party for Neighbourly Love, Freedom, and Diversity
NAMBLA
Joop Wilhelmus
List of pedophile and pederast advocacy organizations

References

Pedophile advocacy
Organizations established in 1982
Organizations disestablished in 2014
1982 establishments in the Netherlands
2014 disestablishments in the Netherlands